University Grants Commission (विश्वविद्यालय अनुदान आयोग) is an autonomous government body of Nepal formed under the jurisdiction of UGC Act approved by the parliament of Nepal on 2 November 1993. UGC became functional in 1994 with the opening of its office at Sanothimi, Bhaktapur. The main reason to establish UGC is to implement the concept of multiple universities in Nepal. Before UGC's establishment only Tribhuwan University looked after the higher education. The main objectives of the UGC are to coordinate among universities; allocate and disburse government grants to universities and higher educational institutions and take appropriate steps for the promotion and maintenance of standards of higher education in Nepal. UGC allocates and distributes grants to the universities and their campuses.

Objectives
The main objectives of UGC are:
 advise The Government of Nepal to establish new universities,
 formulate policy for grants to the universities and higher education institutions,
 disburse grants to universities
 act as a coordinator among the universities.
 determine and maintain the standards of higher education.
 formulate policies to promote quality in higher education.
 arrange scholarships, fellowships etc between the universities and educational institutions within and outside Nepal.

Divisions
The major working division of UGC are:
QAA Certification: The Quality Assurance and Accreditation (QAA) division performs quality assurance regularly to verify the institution or the programme meets the norms and standards prescribed by the QAAC. As of 2020, there are 21 institutes certified by UGC.
Research
Monitoring and Evaluation
Planning and program
Administrative

Composition
UGC has the following members
 One person  nominated  by  Government  of  Nepal  
 Two Vice-Chancellors   nominated   by   Government   of Nepal  from  amongst  Vice-Chancellors  of  Universities
 One member from the National Planning Commission of Nepal 
 Secretary from the  Ministry   of   Education
 Secretary from the Ministry of Finance
 four members nominated  by  Government  of  Nepal  based on educational contribution
 One secretary

See also
Education in Nepal

List of universities and colleges in Nepal

References

External links
UGC Act 2050
Official Website
UGC Journal

Education in Nepal
Universities and colleges in Nepal
1994 establishments in Nepal